Miamira moloch is a species of sea slug or dorid nudibranch, a marine gastropod mollusk in the family Chromodorididae.

Distribution

Description

Ecology

References

 Rudman W.B. (1988). The Chromodorididae (Ophistobranchia: Mollusca) of the Indo-West Pacific: the genus Ceratosoma J.E. Gray. Zoological Journal of the Linnean Society 93 (1): 133-185. page(s): 158 
 Debelius, H. & Kuiter, R.H. (2007) Nudibranchs of the world. ConchBooks, Frankfurt, 360 pp.  page(s): 102
 Gosliner, T.M., Behrens, D.W. & Valdés, Á. (2008) Indo-Pacific Nudibranchs and seaslugs. A field guide to the world's most diverse fauna. Sea Challengers Natural History Books, Washington, 426 pp. page(s): 275
 Johnson R.F. & Gosliner T.M. (2012) Traditional taxonomic groupings mask evolutionary history: A molecular phylogeny and new classification of the chromodorid nudibranchs. PLoS ONE 7(4): e33479

Chromodorididae
Gastropods described in 1988